Idaho Department of Health and Welfare is a public health agency in the state of Idaho.

History 
The department was founded in 1972.

Functions 
The department provides healthcare services, records management, children and family services, food assistance programs, and healthcare services. The department operates several nursing facilities in the state and regulates licensing and certification standards for healthcare workers.

The department has also been responsible for managing the state's response to the COVID-19 pandemic in Idaho.

References 

Government of Idaho
State agencies of Idaho
State departments of health of the United States
Medical and health organizations based in Idaho